Sumwalt is a surname derived as a variation of the surname Zumwalt.

People having this surname include:

 Barbara Lathan Sumwalt, founder of the Barbara Sumwalt Museum on Useppa Island
 Charles L. K. Sumwalt, a Colonel in the 138th Pennsylvania Infantry during the American Civil War
 James Sumwalt, one of the six co-founders of  American computer game development company, Human Head Studios
 Joshua B. Sumwalt, a partner in the quarrying of the Woodstock Quartz Monzonite deposit
 Robert L. Sumwalt (academic) (born 1895; fl. 1975) at the University of South Carolina
 Robert L. Sumwalt (entrepreneur), Jr. (born 1928; fl. 2003), architect, developer, & son of the academic
 Robert L. Sumwalt (NTSB), III (born c. 1950s), pilot, member of the National Transportation Safety Board, & son of the entrepreneur

References